Gunel Mutallimova (born 1 July 1991) is an Azerbaijani footballer who plays as a goalkeeper. She has been a member of the Azerbaijan women's national team.

References

1991 births
Living people
Women's association football goalkeepers
Azerbaijani women's footballers
Azerbaijan women's international footballers